Arbulag (lit. "northern rill") is a sum of Khövsgöl aimag. The area is about 3,360 km², of which 3,120 km² are pasture. In 2000, the sum had 4478 inhabitants, mainly Khotgoid and Darkhad. The center, officially named Mandal is located 75 km northwest of Mörön and 742 kilometers from Ulaanbaatar.

History 

The Arbulag sum was founded, together with the whole Khövsgöl aimag, in 1931. In 1933, it had about 3,200 inhabitants in 911 households, and about 106,000 heads of livestock. In 1959, areas from Arbulag and Alag-Erdene sum were joined the new Sümber sum, but this sum soon was joined to Arbulag again. The local negdel was founded in 1939, under the name Sörtiin negdel. Later the name was changed to Mandal.

Economy 

In 2004, there were roughly 135,000 heads of livestock, among them 58,000 sheep, 58,000 goats, 9,700 cattle and yaks, 9,300 horses, and 200 camels. There are some phosphorite and bauxite reserves in the area.

Interesting Places 

In 1953/56, remains of a palace and a stele from the time of Mönkh Khaan were discovered near the border to Bürentogtokh. About 10 km east of the sum center is a large Ovoo known as Tsagaan chuluutyn ovoo that, according to local folklore, might be the grave of Chingünjav.

Literature 

M.Nyamaa, Khövsgöl aimgiin lavlakh toli, Ulaanbaatar 2001, p. 18f

References 

Districts of Khövsgöl Province